Hijack were a British hip hop group, hailing from Brixton, London, featuring Kamanchi Sly, DJ Supreme, DJ Undercover, Ulysses, Agent Fritz and Agent Clueso. Their first single, "Style Wars" (Music of Life, 1988) caught the attention of the British hip hop community. Their next release, "Hold No Hostage"/"Doomsday of Rap" (Music of Life, 1989) became an underground hit across Europe, bringing them to the attention of West Coast rapper Ice-T.

Overview
Ice-T signed the group to his own Rhyme Syndicate record label, and they recorded and released the single "The Badman is Robbin'" (Rhyme Syndicate, 1989). The track reached #56 in the UK Singles Chart. The group's debut album, The Horns of Jericho (Rhyme Syndicate, 1991), was recorded around the same time. Hijack also released the single "Style Wars - Style Warriors Revenge" back on the Music of Life label while they were waiting for their album to be released but Warner (who had a distribution deal with Rhyme Syndicate) did not release the album in the United States.

The Horns of Jericho (1991-1994)
In 1991, The Horns of Jericho was released, but not in the U.S. The group released the single "Daddy Rich" which was popular in the UK. The music video for "Daddy Rich" was shot in Los Angeles.

Breakup
Because Warner Brothers did not release the album to the US market, Hijack soon parted company with the label then later split due to musical differences and went their separate ways. DJ Supreme founded Backbone Records, whilst Kamanchi Sly and DJ Undercover founded Reservoir Records and recorded as Mr Pink and Mr Blonde for a short period. Sly also appeared on Nicolas Dresti's singles "Tha Wildstyle" and "Tha Horns of Jericho". Nicolas assumed the name of DJ Supreme in 1996 which he used until 1998. Kamanchi Sly changed his name to Unknown MC and had chart success with his brother, DJ Pied Piper. DJ Pied Piper and the Masters of Ceremonies' single "Do You Really Like It?" (Relentless Records, 2001) reached number one in the UK.

Since then, Kamanchi Sly released two EPs in 2004. DJ Supreme attended the Scratchcon 2000 seminar in San Francisco, California, which was hosted by DJ Qbert. Supreme is an active DJ on the European nightclub circuit and continues to work in record production. His most recent project included the making of his semi-biographical documentary film, The Turntable Trixters, which chronicles the history of Hijack. The film was recently screened by the British Film Institute and a DVD is available.

Hijack have re-formed and released a single in 2016 under Reservoir Records entitled "Doing What We Wonna Do". Alongside this, Kamanchi Sly has also released some solo music via his channel on YouTube.

Discography
 Style Wars (Music of Life Records, 1988)
 Hold No Hostage / Doomsday of Rap (Music of Life Records, 1989)
 The Badman Is Robbin (Rhyme Syndicate Records, 1990)
 Style Warriors Revenge (Music of Life Records, 1990)
 Daddy Rich (Rhyme Syndicate Records, 1991)
 The Horns of Jericho (Rhyme Syndicate Records, 1991)
 The Original Horns of Jericho / Instrumental Movie Soundtrack (Reservoir Records, 1997)
 The Horns of Jericho 25th Anniversary Release (BackBone Records, 2015)

References

External links

[ Allmusic.com - Discography]

English hip hop groups
Musical groups from London